The Springfield Schoolhouse, in Springfield, Colorado, is an 1889 rural schoolhouse built with sandstone quarried east of town. It served as a school until 1920 when it became a Masonic Lodge. It has been known as Springfield Masonic Temple. It originally had a belfrey with school bell, but these elements were lost at some undetermined time.

It was listed on the National Register of Historic Places in 1977, as part of the Rural School Buildings in Colorado Multiple Property Submission.

It was acquired by the Springfield Masonic Temple Association during 1921–25.

The main floor of the building has been used for meetings of Masonic groups, and there is a kitchen and dining area below.  By 1976, the stairway down to the lower level had been covered over and was no longer in use.

See also
 National Register of Historic Places listings in Baca County, Colorado

References

Buildings and structures in Baca County, Colorado
Masonic buildings in Colorado
Clubhouses on the National Register of Historic Places in Colorado
School buildings on the National Register of Historic Places in Colorado
1889 establishments in Colorado
National Register of Historic Places in Baca County, Colorado
School buildings completed in 1889